David Michael Odiete (born 24 February 1993) is an Italian rugby union player of Nigerian descent. His position is on the wing and he currently plays for Stade Niçois.

He was named in the Italian squad for the 2016 Six Nations Championship. He made his debut on 6 February against France	

From 2012 to 2015, he played with Zebre in Pro12 and in 2016–17 Pro12 season, he played for Benetton Treviso.
From 2020 to 2022 he played for Stade Dijonnais.

References

External links
 

1993 births
Living people
Italian rugby union players
Italian people of Nigerian descent
Italian sportspeople of African descent
Italy international rugby union players
Sportspeople from Reggio Emilia
Rugby union fullbacks